The Akron Zips women's basketball team represents the University of Akron in women's basketball. The school competes in the Mid-American Conference in Division I of the National Collegiate Athletic Association (NCAA). The Zips play home basketball games at the James A. Rhodes Arena in Akron, Ohio.

Season-by-season record
As of the 2015–16 season, the Zips are 434–713 in 42 years of play. They have won one MAC title, in 2014 (after finishing as runner up the previous year), which is also their only appearance in the NCAA Tournament. As a 13 seed, they lost to #5 Purdue 84–55. They have reached the Women's National Invitation Tournament (WNIT) in 1999, 2013, 2015 along an appearance in the Women's Basketball Invitational in 2010.

Postseason appearances

NCAA Division I Tournament appearances

References

External links